Nelson McCormick is an American director and producer of film and television.

Some of his television directing credits include NYPD Blue, V.I.P, Alias, House, Third Watch, ER, Prison Break, 24, The Closer, Southland, Nip/Tuck, Body of Proof, The West Wing, Criminal Minds, Daredevil and Lovecraft Country, among other TV series.

He also directed two remakes of 1980s feature films Prom Night (2008) and The Stepfather (2009).

References

External links

Nelson McCormick's Official Website

American film directors
American television directors
American television producers
Living people
Place of birth missing (living people)
Year of birth missing (living people)
Advertising directors